The Lufira masked weaver (Ploceus ruweti), also known as Ruwet's masked weaver or the Lake Lufira weaver, is a species of bird in the weaver family, Ploceidae. It is endemic to the Democratic Republic of the Congo. Its natural habitat is swamps in the south-east part of the country. It is sometimes regarded as a subspecies of the Tanzanian masked weaver.

References

Lufira masked weaver
Endemic birds of the Democratic Republic of the Congo
Lufira masked weaver
Lufira masked weaver
Taxonomy articles created by Polbot
Central Zambezian miombo woodlands